Alphonse Van Mele (29 December 1891 – 11 January 1972) was a Belgian gymnast who competed in the 1920 Summer Olympics. He was part of the Belgian team, which won the silver medal in the gymnastics men's team, European system event in 1920.

References

External links
profile

1891 births
1972 deaths
Belgian male artistic gymnasts
Gymnasts at the 1920 Summer Olympics
Olympic gymnasts of Belgium
Olympic silver medalists for Belgium
Olympic medalists in gymnastics
Medalists at the 1920 Summer Olympics